Altmaier is a German surname. 'Alt' means 'old'. Notable people with the surname include:

 Daniel Altmaier (born 1998), German tennis player
 Peter Altmaier (born 1958), German politician

See also
 Peter Altmeier
 Maier

German-language surnames
Surnames of German origin